Potamogeton ogdenii, common name Ogden's pondweed, is a perennial plant native to North America.

Conservation status in the United States
It is listed as endangered in Connecticut, Massachusetts, and New York.

References

ogdenii